Pehin Khatib Abdullah Mosque is a mosque located in Kulapis, a settlement in Brunei-Muara District, Brunei. It was inaugurated in May 2017; it can accommodate 700 worshippers. The mosque serves the need of the Muslim residents in Kulapis for Islamic communal prayers and activities, in particular the Jumu'ah or Friday prayers.

History 
The construction of the mosque began on 14 September 2015 and completed in less than two years. It was officially opened on 19 May 2017 by Sultan Hassanal Bolkiah, the Sultan of Brunei after attending the first ever Jumu'ah being held in the mosque.

See also 
 List of mosques in Brunei

References 

2017 establishments in Brunei
Mosques completed in 2017
Mosques in Brunei